MusicFest Canada, originally established as the Canadian Stage Band Festival (CSBF) in Toronto, is a national educational music festival in Canada. It was founded in 1972 by Robert Richmond (the founding president), Gary Wadsworth and Paul Miner. The CSBF added vocal and concert band components in 1981 and 1985, respectively. The name was changed to MusicFest Canada, in 1987, embracing the instrumental jazz, concert band and choral/vocal jazz divisions. In 2012, in partnership with the National Arts Centre, they added a 4th orchestra/strings division.

MusicFest Canada is an invitation-only event. Ensembles must earn an invitation by performing at an outstanding level at one of the 54 affiliated festivals from coast to coast. The average attendance at “The Nationals” is about 7,000.

Ensembles are adjudicated by noted Canadian and U.S. professionals in the jazz, band, orchestra and choral fields. Classifications are either by age (Jazz and Choral) or by an established level set by test piece (Concert Bands and Orchestras). Performing ensembles are ranked according to gold, silver, and bronze; awards and scholarships are also presented to individual musicians.

In addition MusicFest hosts 6 National honour ensembles; the Woodshed Canadian Percussion Ensemble, the Denis Wick Canadian Wind Orchestra, the Thomastik-Infeld Canadian String Orchestra, the Ellison Canadian Concert Choir, the Conn-Selmer Centerstage Jazz Band and the National Youth Jazz Combo.

National finals 
The national finals are officially held in spring (usually 5 days in May) in several Canadian cities. Regional competitions are held during the preceding three months. Nearly 250,000 musicians participate annually in the preliminary events; some 8,000 (in more than 350 jazz and concert bands, orchestras, jazz combos, and choral groups) proceeded to the finals.

Activities at the national finals have also included clinics and concerts, the latter offered over the years by the Boss Brass, Gary Burton, Canadian Brass, the Humber College Faculty Band, Maynard Ferguson, and Woody Herman big bands, the Montreal Jubilation Gospel Choir, Oscar Peterson, Quazz, UZEB, the Swingle Singers, the Nathaniel Dett Chorale, Vertical Voices, Sixth Wave, the Eastman Wind Ensemble, Diana Krall, the New York Voices and others. The festival's closing concert of winning ensembles has been documented by TV specials produced for TVOntario, CBC Television and in 1976, 1977 and annually beginning in 1980, CTV.

Host cities 
 Toronto (1973-1977, 1984, 1989, 1994, 1996, 1999, 2000, 2003, 2013, 2015, 2018, and 2021)
 Winnipeg (1978 and 1990)
 Vancouver (1979, at Expo 86, 1991, 1998, 2005, 2007, 2011, and 2014)
 Ottawa (1980, 1987, 1997, 2001, 2006, 2008, 2010, 2012, 2016, and 2019)
 Edmonton (1981 and 1993)
 Hamilton (1982)
 Calgary (1983, 1988, 1995, 2002, and 2020)
 Quebec City (1985)
 Halifax (1992)
 Montreal (2004)
 Markham (2009)
 Niagara Falls, Ontario (2017, 2023)

Board and Officers

Executive Director/Associate Director 
Jim Howard was appointed as the national co-ordinator in 1984 and the executive director in 1985. In 2016, Neil Yorke-Slater was appointed as the associate director.

Current executives 
 Peter Grant, Immediate Past Chairman of the Board
 Bryan Stovell, President
 Jim Howard, Executive director
 Neil Yorke-Slader, Treasurer and Associate director
 Andy Morris, Director
 Kevin Merkley, Secretary
 Carmella Luvisotto, Vice-President
 Colin Clarke, Director
 Dr. Mark Hopkins, Director

Additional Dividional Chairs 
 John Chalmers, Choral/Vocal Jazz Division
 Sharon Fitzsimmons, Concert Band Division
 Neil Yorke-Slader, Instrumental Jazz Division
 Dr. Tony Leong, Orchestra/String Division

Presidents-past and present 
 Robert Richmond (1972–1984)
 John Nikel (1984–1986)
 Allen S. Michalek (1986–1996)
 Tom Glenn (1996–2005)
 Mark Wicken (2005–2018)
 Denny Christianson (2018–2021)
 Bryan Stovell, (2021–present)

Vice-presidents and officers 
 Carmella Luvisotto (Vice-President)
 Bryan Stovell (President)
 Dr. Mark Hopkins (Director)
 Peter Grant (Immediate past chairman of the board)
 Kevin Merkley (Director)
 Andy Morris (Director)
 Neil Yorke-Salder (Associate Director)
 Jim Howard (Executive Director)
 Colin Clarke (Director)

Notes

References

External links
 MusicFest Canada

Jazz festivals in Canada
Music festivals in Toronto
Recurring events established in 1972
1972 establishments in Ontario